The 2012 Vuelta a Burgos was the 34th edition of the Vuelta a Burgos road cycling stage race, which was held from 1 August to 5 August 2012.

General classification

References

Further reading

Vuelta a Burgos
2012 in road cycling
2012 in Spanish sport